Lovin' is the sixth extended play by South Korean singer Ailee. It was released by Rocket3 Entertainment on May 7, 2021, and consists of six tracks, including two lead singles "Make Up Your Mind" and "Spring Flowers".

Background and release
On April 16, 2021, Rocket3 Entertainment announced that Ailee would be releasing an extended play in May ahead of her third studio album. On April 23, the track listing was released, followed by the teaser video for "Make Up Your Mind" on April 30, which featured actor Park Eun-seok. On May 4, the teaser audio for "Make Up Your Mind" was released. On May 7, the extended play was released.

Composition
The extended play contains two lead singles. The first, "Make Up Your Mind", is described as a song that expresses the excitement of new couple who just started a relationship. The second, "Spring Flowers", is described as song that compares fans and those whom can't meet for a quite some time to the flowers which bloom in spring.

Commercial performance
Lovin debuted at position 91 on South Korea's Gaon Album Chart in the chart issue dated May 9–15, 2021. The extended play then ascended to position 64 in the chart issue dated May 16–22, 2021.

Track listing

Charts

Release history

References

2021 EPs
Korean-language EPs
Ailee EPs